Bhutan Time (BTT) is the time zone of Bhutan. It is six hours ahead of UTC (UTC+06:00). Bhutan does not observe Daylight saving time.

IANA time zone database
The IANA time zone database contains one zone for Bhutan in the file zone.tab, which is named Asia/Thimphu.

See also
Bangladesh Standard Time

References

Geography of Bhutan
Time zones